Mohammad Ali Talpur is a well known contemporary Pakistani artist. He is considered as the only minimalist artist in Pakistan because of his linear drawings. He is teaching at National College of Arts and works at his studio in Lahore. His works has been exhibited in national and international art galleries like Art & Public gallery, Geneva, XVA gallery, Dubai, Finsbury Park, England, Shanghai art fair, 2007, Dubai Art Fair, 2008 and Hong Kong art fair, 2008.

Life
Mohammad Ali Talpur was born in 1976 in Tando Jam, Sindh. He spent his childhood in his home town Tando Jam then he moved to Lahore. He got his BFA degree in 1998 from the National College of Arts, Lahore. His brother Amjad Ali Talpur als        

so a University Lecturer in Arts, working at Shaheed Allah Buksh Soomro University of Art, Design, & Heritages, Jamshoro. Now he lives and works in Lah ore.

Art career
His work passed through various phases to get the unique identity. He is known for his linear drawings, these drawings reflect the magical quality that a viewer can not resist to pass through the inner essence of visual pleasure. He creates drawings  like poetry by arranging the cluster of lines on paper and deliberately states "art without content" which interpret the existence of life.

References

External links 
 https://web.archive.org/web/20160304111354/http://jang.com.pk/thenews/may2009-weekly/nos-10-05-2009/enc.htm#3
 https://web.archive.org/web/20120313024727/http://www.greencardamom.net/artists/artists_page.php?id=21
 http://jang.com.pk/thenews/feb2010-weekly/nos-07-02-2010/enc.htm#1
 https://web.archive.org/web/20110210054544/http://www.nuktaartmag.com/Nukta/GeneralContent/View/106
 http://universes-in-universe.org/eng/intartdata/artists/asia/pak/talpur_mohammad
 
https://web.archive.org/web/20110828014950/http://www.granta.com/Online-Only/High-Noon-IV
https://web.archive.org/web/20111028120122/http://www.artpublic.ch/artists/talpur/talpur1.php
http://www.douglaswhite.co.uk/drawn-from-life-abbott-hall-gallery/
http://www.delhievents.com/2010/01/devi-art-foundation-presents-reassemble.html
 https://web.archive.org/web/20110830111059/http://www.ameinfo.com/147446.html

Pakistani painters
Living people
National College of Arts alumni
People from Hyderabad District, Pakistan
Artists from Lahore
Sindhi people
Artists from Sindh
1976 births
Pakistani contemporary artists